Football in Uruguay stands as the most popular sport. The Uruguay national football team has won two FIFA World Cup titles in addition to a record 15 Copa América titles, making them one of the most successful teams in South America. The national team won the first edition of the tournament in 1930, and won it again in 1950.

Also, the Uruguay national football team won the Olympic Games twice, in 1924 Summer Olympics and 1928 as well as the Copa de Oro de Campeones Mundiales ("Mundialito") in 1980–1981.

History

The sport was introduced by British immigrants and expatriates in the 19th century. Some references say that the game had been introduced in 1880, at the English High School by Henry Castle Ayre, born in Bedminster in March 1852.

The first recorded football match in Uruguay was played in 1881 between Montevideo Rowing Club (established in 1874) and Montevideo Cricket Club (1861), while Albion F.C. –established in Montevideo in 1891– was the first football club in the country.

British football clubs tours over South America contributed to the spread and development of football in Uruguay during the first years of the 20th century. The first club to tour was Southampton in 1904, followed by several teams (mainly from England although some Scotland clubs also visited South America) until 1929 with Chelsea being the last team to tour.

British teams were considered the best in the world by then, and some of them served as inspiration to establish football clubs in Uruguay and Argentina, helped by the immigration of British citizens that had arrived to work for British companies (mostly in railway construction). CURCC and Albion are some examples of clubs established by British immigrants to South America.

Uruguay is a country with a population that does not exceed more than three and a half million, and features a large concentration of professional football teams in the city of Montevideo. The two biggest club teams in the country's Primera División are Peñarol, the continuation of CURCC, and Nacional, founded in 1899.

Club football

Nacional is  a result of the fusion between Montevideo Football Club and Uruguay Athletic Club, 14 May 1899. It was decided there that the club's flag 
Club football in Uruguay is dominated by two big Montevideo clubs, Peñarol and Nacional, which compete in the AUF Championships (Primera División). Peñarol won the tournament in 51 times (including titles by its predecessor, CURRC) and Nacional 49 times, since it began in 1900. Other teams winning the league were Danubio (4 times), Defensor Sporting (4 times), River Plate F.C. (4 times), Montevideo Wanderers (3 times), Rampla Juniors (1 time), Bella Vista (1 time), Progreso (1 time), Central Español (1 time). Also, during 1923 and 1924, existed other Uruguayan football league, the FUF (Uruguayan Football Federation). Only had two tournaments, obtained by Atlético Wanderers and Peñarol (was expulsed from AUF in 1922 and reincorporated in 1926, during the Torneo del Consejo Provisorio, won by Peñarol).

Nacional and Peñarol have each won three times the Intercontinental Cup also been successful in South American competition, with Nacional having won the Copa Interamericana twice, the Recopa Sudamericana one time and Copa Libertadores three times, and Peñarol having conquered Copa Libertadores five times. Recently; 2011 Peñarol reached to the finals, and fell against Brazilian side Santos.

Matches between Peñarol and Nacional are termed the Uruguayan Clásico, the longest running football derby outside Great Britain.

Most other clubs in top division are also from Montevideo. In the 2015–16 Uruguayan Primera División season, only two clubs, Plaza Colonia and Juventud de Las Piedras, came from outside the capital. Nowadays (2023) Colonia, Maldonado and Cerro Largo are the only departments that are represented in Uruguay's First Division.

Many Uruguayan footballers have been successful in European football, including current players Luis Suárez, Edinson Cavani and as well retired players as Diego Forlán. Forlán had a successful career in Spain with Atlético Madrid, where he won both the European Golden Shoe and Pichichi Trophy twice. Suárez has had a successful career in England (with Liverpool) and Spain (with Barcelona), where he won the European Golden Shoe twice and the Pichichi Trophy.

National team

The Uruguay national team have won more international tournaments than any other country. In the Copa América, they are the most successful team, having won 15 titles. Uruguay won the first FIFA World Cup in 1930, defeating fierce rivals Argentina in the final. In 1950, they won their second World Cup, defeating Brazil in the Maracanã in the final. They have also won two Olympic gold medals in 1924 and 1928. Finally, they also won the 1980 Mundialito, a competition in Montevideo for all of the countries that had ever won the World Cup.

Between 1970 and 2010, they failed to reach the semi-finals of the World Cup until 2010, when they finished fourth.

Remarkable players
 Alcides Ghiggia – played in the 1950 World Cup, perhaps most remembered for having scored the second goal at the 34th minute of the second half in the tournament final against Brazil, known as the "Maracanazo".
 Juan Alberto Schiaffino – widely regarded as the best player Uruguay has ever produced, and one of the best players in history of the game. He won the 1950 FIFA World Cup with his national team.
 Luis Suárez – is the all-time top scorer for Uruguay where he won the 2011 Copa América. At club level he won 2 European Golden Shoe awards, and numerous trophies.

Women's national team
The women's football national team of the AUF started in 1996 and the first official competition of the national team took place in 1998.
They have played against national teams of South America and teams of other continents.
There were won and lost matches, but they never missed the partnership spirit and the fair play.
The most remarkable matches were against teams like Argentina, Peru, Ecuador, China and other teams.
They never participated in a World cup, but they could achieve to participe in a Southamerican championship.
This great team is made up of players aged 16 to 30 years. Its more recent games were against Brazil, on March 8, Colombia on March 10 and Venezuela on March 12, all in the same year.

Other notable Primera División teams
Danubio Football Club is a club of professional football of the Montevieo-Uruguay. It was founded on March 1, 1932 and it plays in the First Division. It obtained four Uruguayan Championships at the First Division in 1988, 2004, 2006, 2007, 2013 and 2014. At international competitions it reached the semi-final in the Copa Libertadores in 1989. In addition to that, according to the IFFHS Danubio is the third best Uruguayan club of the 20th century, just behind the two big Uruguayan teams.
Its debut was in the Plaza de deportes en La Unión, which finished with a defeat scoring 1-0, but they did not give up themselves and it managed to turn itself a great club of the Uruguayan football. The team has 17 national titles and 17 official. Its stadium was inaugurated on August 25, 1957.

Another notable first division team is Defensor Sporting Club, a professional club of Montevideo, Uruguay. It won four Uruguayan Championships, in 1976, 1987, 1991 and 2007-08. At international competitions it reached the semi-final in the Copa Libertadores in 2014. In addition to that, according to the IFFHS, Defensor Sporting was the best club of the world during September 2007.

List by capacity 
The following is a list of football stadiums in Uruguay, ordered by capacity.

Largest football stadiums in Uruguay

See also
 Sport in Uruguay
 Uruguayan football league system
 Uruguayan Primera División
 Uruguayan Football Stadiums

Notes

References